Patrick Scales (born February 11, 1988) is an American football long snapper for the Chicago Bears of the National Football League (NFL). He played college football at Utah State. He has also been a member of the Baltimore Ravens, Miami Dolphins, New York Jets and Tampa Bay Buccaneers.

Early years
Scales played high school football for at Weber High School in Pleasant View, Utah. He was a second-team all-region selection for the Warriors. He saw time at tight end, defensive end and long snapper. Scales also played basketball and baseball. He earned academic all-state and all-region honors.

College career
Scales played for the Utah State Aggies from 2007 to 2010. He was redshirted in 2006.

Professional career
Scales was rated as the 11th best long snapper in the 2011 NFL Draft by NFLDraftScout.com.

Baltimore Ravens
Scales signed with the Baltimore Ravens on July 27, 2011 after going undrafted in the 2011 NFL Draft. He was released by the Ravens on September 3, 2011. He signed with the Ravens on May 1, 2012. Scales was released by the team on August 26, 2012.

Miami Dolphins
Scales was signed by the Miami Dolphins on April 8, 2013. He was released by the Dolphins on May 15, 2013.

New York Jets
Scales signed with the New York Jets on July 23, 2013. He was released by the Jets on August 26, 2013.

Tampa Bay Buccaneers
Scales signed a futures deal with the Tampa Bay Buccaneers on January 6, 2014. He was released by the Buccaneers on April 9, 2014.

Baltimore Ravens
Scales was signed by the Baltimore Ravens on December 18, 2014. He made his NFL debut on December 21, 2014 against the Houston Texans. He was released by the Ravens on August 31, 2015.

Chicago Bears
Scales signed with the Chicago Bears on November 28, 2015. On March 4, 2017, he signed a one-year extension with the Bears. On August 28, 2017, he was waived/injured by the Bears and placed on injured reserve after suffering a torn ACL in the team's third preseason game.

On March 27, 2018, Scales re-signed with the Bears. On April 2, 2019, Scales re-signed with the Bears on a one year deal. Scales re-signed with the Bears on March 26, 2020. He re-signed with the team to another one-year contract on April 7, 2021.

On March 15, 2022, Scales signed a one-year, $1.27 million contract extension with Chicago. He signed a contract extension on March 10, 2023.

References

Living people
1988 births
People from North Ogden, Utah
Players of American football from Louisville, Kentucky
Players of American football from Utah
American football long snappers
Utah State Aggies football players
Baltimore Ravens players
Chicago Bears players